General Marston may refer to:

Gilman Marston (1811–1890), Union Army brigadier general
John Marston (USMC) (1884–1957), U.S. Marine Corps major general

See also
Attorney General Marston (disambiguation)